René Bianchi may refer to:
 René Bianchi (cyclist) (born 1934), French cyclist
 René Bianchi (perfumer) (died 1578), Italian  perfumer